The Mutual Blackbird was a late 1920s two-seat open cockpit sporting biplane.

Development
The aircraft was designed in 1929 by Giuseppe Bellanca for the Mutual Aircraft Company (also known as the Mutual Aircraft Service Inc). The Blackbird was built by Mutual at their factory in Kansas City, Missouri and first flew later that year. Although the sole aircraft X87M successfully completed some long-distance flights, no further production was undertaken.

Operational history and preservation
The Blackbird flew successfully for 18 months before being damaged in a crash on landing near Kansas City on return from New York on 13 April 1931.  The aircraft was stored in a barn until it was rediscovered in early 1995. It was restored by the San Diego Air & Space Museum at Gillespie Field, later displayed at the Yanks Air Museum, at Chino Airport in Chino, California and is currently (June 2018) displayed at the Gig Harbor Antique Airplane Museum, Gig Harbor, Washington.

Specifications

References

Notes

Bibliography

External links
 Technical details and photograph at aerofiles.com

1920s United States civil utility aircraft
Biplanes
Single-engined tractor aircraft
Aircraft first flown in 1929